Triogma is a genus of crane fly in the family Cylindrotomidae.

Biology
The larvae of the genus Triogma live on mosses. Adults are to be found in damp wooded habitats.

Distribution
Canada, Northern United States, Japan, China & Northern Europe

Species
T. exsculpta Osten Sacken, 1865
T. kuwanai (Alexander, 1913)
T. nimbipennis Alexander, 1941
T. trisulcata (Schummel, 1829)

References

Cylindrotomidae
Diptera of North America
Diptera of Asia
Diptera of Europe